The 12269 / 70 Chennai Central–Hazrat Nizamuddin Duronto Express is an Express train of the Duronto Express category belonging to Indian Railways – Southern Railway zone that runs between  and  in India.

It operates as train number 12269 from Chennai Central to Hazrat Nizamuddin and as train number 12270 in the reverse direction, serving the states of Tamil Nadu, Andhra Pradesh, Maharashtra, Madhya Pradesh, Uttar Pradesh & Delhi.

It was part of the Duronto Express series of trains introduced by the then railway minister of India Ms. Mamata Banerjee in the 2009–10 railway budget

Coaches

The 12269 / 70 Chennai Central–Hazrat Nizamuddin Duronto Express presently has 1 AC 1st Class, 2 AC 2 tier, 4 AC 3 tier, 8 Sleeper class & 2 End on Generator Coaches. In addition, it also carries a pantry car.

As is customary with most train services in India, coach composition may be amended at the discretion of Indian Railways depending on demand.

Service

Routeing 

Traction

It is hauled by a Royapuram based WAP 7 end to end.

Timings

12269 Chennai Central–Hazrat Nizamuddin Duronto Express leaves Chennai Central every Monday & Friday reaching Hazrat Nizamuddin the next day.
12270 Hazrat Nizamuddin–Chennai Central Duronto Express leaves Hazrat Nizamuddin every Tuesday & Saturday reaching Chennai Central the next day.

References

External links

 
 

Transport in Delhi
Transport in Chennai
Rail transport in Maharashtra
Rail transport in Madhya Pradesh
Rail transport in Andhra Pradesh
Rail transport in Uttar Pradesh
Duronto Express trains
Rail transport in Tamil Nadu
Rail transport in Delhi
Railway services introduced in 2009